Warren Mahy is an artist whose work has appeared in role-playing games and other fantasy works.

Early life and education
Warren was born in the small sea side town of Whakatane in New Zealand. He grew up surrounded by the wonders of the Pacific Ocean and the native New Zealand bush. This influenced his life towards a career in design and illustration.

Career
After finishing school Warren went on to complete a trade certificate in offset printing and then eventually found his way via an old school friend, Ben Wootten, to Weta Workshop Ltd where Ben and he were employed as concept designers during the Lord of the Rings, King Kong and Narnia films. Warren then freelanced from his studio/home in Tauranga working on storyboarding and illustrations for the RPG and Trading card industry. He currently works as a teacher for Graphic Designs at a secondary school.

Warren has been a freelance concept designer, story board artist and production illustrator for the film, TV and gaming industry. His most notable work so far would be his contribution to the designing of Peter Jackson’s trilogy of blockbusters, The Lord of The Rings. His influence can also be seen in numerous other films, including the remake of King Kong and Andrew Adamson’s Narnia series. Warren’s illustrations are also seen in print, predominantly within the Trading card and the Role playing industry.

Mahy is also known for his work on Magic: The Gathering.

Special effects
 The Chronicles of Narnia: The Lion, the Witch and the Wardrobe (2005): Designer
 The Lord of the Rings: The Return of the King (2003): Designer
 The Lord of the Rings: The Two Towers (2002): Designer
 The Lord of the Rings: The Fellowship of the Ring (2001): Designer

Art
 The Lord of the Rings: The Fellowship of the Ring (2001): Designer
 The Lord of the Rings: The Two Towers (2002): Designer
 The Lord of the Rings: The Return of the King (2003) : Designer
 The World of Kong (2005) : Designer
 The Crafting of Narnia (2008) : Designer

References

External links
 Warren Mahy's website
 

Living people
People educated at Whakatane High School
People from Whakatāne
Role-playing game artists
Year of birth missing (living people)